Aechmea brachystachys is a species  of flowering plant in the genus Aechmea. This species is endemic to Peru. It is known only from the type locale near Loreto and listed as "critically endangered."

References

brachystachys
Flora of Peru
Plants described in 1927
Endangered plants